The Heinkel HD 16 was a single-engine biplane torpedo aircraft developed by the German aviation company Ernst Heinkel Flugzeugwerke in the nineteen-twenties and produced under license by Svenska Aero in Stockholm, Sweden.

Development 
The Heinkel HD 16 was an improvised version of the company's earlier Heinkel HD 14. Two HD 16s were built and sold to the Swedish Navy and designated T 1. The T 1 was equipped with two 14-cylinder Armstrong Siddeley Leopard radial engines with 666 Horsepower. The plane carried a m / 17 type torpedo. This torpedo was built in Sweden, had a caliber of 45 cm and weighed about 800 kg. The aircraft was also armed with a 7.7 mm machine gun. On delivery, the pilot and the observer were placed side by side. The cockpit was subsequently modified in tandem to allow a better view for the observer.

Specifications

References

1920s German military reconnaissance aircraft
HD 16
Single-engined tractor aircraft
Biplanes
Aircraft first flown in 1928